Megalochoerus is an extinct genus of large and long-legged pig-like animals from the Miocene of Africa.

Taxonomy
The species M. khinzikebirus and M. marymuunguae were once considered to belong to the related Kubanochoerus or Libycochoerus, but have since been reassigned to Megalochoerus.

Megalochoerus marymuuguae was the smallest and earliest of the three species, while M. humungous was the latest occurring and largest.

Description
Megalochoerus contained some of the largest suids ever known to exist. Weight estimates of M. khinzikebirus, intermediate in size between the other two species, have been as high as  based on dental morphology, easily larger than other giant fossil pigs such as Kubanochoerus and Notochoerus. Other calculations based on molar and humerus measurements have yielded lower estimates for M. khinzikebirus;   based on measurements of the lower molar (m/1),  
and  based on articulation of the distal humerus.

References

Prehistoric Suidae
Miocene mammals of Africa
Miocene even-toed ungulates
Fossil taxa described in 1993
Prehistoric even-toed ungulate genera